Arránquense Muchachos (Start Boys) is an album by Mexican recording artist Pedro Fernández, released independently by “Pedro Fernández 2018” on August 17, 2018 and distributed by Sony Music Entertainment.

This is album number 40 in the career of Pedro Fernández, and was recorded in Mexico City and Monterrey, Nuevo León. It contains 13 songs that include the executive production of Pedro Fernández and the musical direction of Jorge Avendaño.

"Arránquense Muchachos" besides being the title of the album, was also the first promotional cut, a melody that emerged from the inspiration of Israel Dasis.

After that success, would give way to "Como Ella" second single which is already heard on the radio since its launch in July.

The title cut from the album “Arránquense Muchachos” was nominated for the 19th Annual Latin Grammy Awards 2018. Best Regional Song.

Track listing

References

External links
 Pedro Fernandez official website
 

2018 albums
Pedro Fernández (singer) albums